There are 92 association football teams in the top four divisions of English football, all of which have a manager, sometimes given the alternative title of head coach, or the role is currently vacated. The Premier League and the English Football League (EFL) are the only fully professional football leagues in England. The Premier League is the top tier, and consists of 20 clubs at the top of the English football league system, while the remaining 72 clubs are split into the three divisions of the EFL: the Championship, League One and League Two.

A 2020 study by broadcaster Sky Sports showed the average reign for departing managers in the 2019–20 season was an all-time low of 423 days. Simon Weaver is currently the longest-serving manager in the top four divisions, having managed Harrogate Town since May 2009, though eleven of those years were outside the EFL; accordingly, Accrington Stanley manager John Coleman has the longest concurrent tenure as manager in the EFL, having been appointed in September 2014, and the second longest in total. Following the dismissal of Sean Dyche by Burnley in April 2022, Liverpool manager Jürgen Klopp became the longest serving manager currently in the Premier League, and following Gareth Ainsworth's depature from Wycombe Wanderers to Queens Park Rangers in 2023, the third longest overall in England's top-four divisions.

Some managers in the EFL have had more than one spell in charge at their current club, as is the case with Coleman, currently in his second reign in charge having previously spent 13 years as manager of the club. This list includes every manager currently managing a club in the Premier League and the EFL, in order of the date that they were appointed.

Managers

See also
 List of Premier League managers
 List of EFL Championship managers
 League Managers Association

Notes

References

Caretaker managers

English Football League